Cream of the Crop 2003 is a four-CD live album by the Allman Brothers Band. It was recorded from July 25 to August 10, 2003 at six different concert venues.  It was released on June 15, 2018.

Cream of the Crop 2003 features the 2001 to 2014 lineup of the Allman Brothers Band – Gregg Allman on keyboards and vocals, Warren Haynes on guitar and vocals, Derek Trucks on guitar, Oteil Burbridge on bass, Butch Trucks on drums, Jai Johanny Johanson on drums, and Marc Quiñones on percussion.

Highlights LP 
Cream of the Crop 2003: Highlights is a three-LP edition of 16 songs selected from the four-CD album. It was released on gold, silver, and red vinyl on April 23, 2022, as part of Record Store Day.

Critical reception 
In the Sarasota Herald-Tribune, Wade Tatengelo wrote, "Recorded during the same exciting period resulting in the acclaimed One Way Out double live album, Cream Of The Crop is now probably the best representation of the Allman Brothers' 2001 to 2014 lineup... It's 36 songs with no repeats clocking in at over five hours."

In Relix, Alan Paul said, "The Allman Brothers Band only recorded one studio album, 2003's Hittin' the Note, during their final lineup’s 13-year run. That's a shame for many reasons, not least of which is that, as their new archival release Cream of the Crop 2003 quickly demonstrates, the group came alive when they had some new material.... Avoiding any song repeats, the collection has the flow of a show, thanks to excellent selection and sequencing by supervising producer Warren Haynes."

Track listing 
Disc one
"Don't Want You No More" (Spencer Davis, Edward Hardin) – 2:49
"It's Not My Cross to Bear" (Gregg Allman) – 4:55
"Black Hearted Woman" (G. Allman) – 6:49
"Rocking Horse" (G. Allman, Warren Haynes, Allen Woody, Jack Pearson) – 8:45
"Hot 'Lanta" (G. Allman, Duane Allman, Dickey Betts, Butch Trucks, Berry Oakley, Jai Johanny Johanson) – 5:22
"Old Before My Time" (G. Allman, Haynes) – 5:35
"Come and Go Blues" (G. Allman) – 5:57
"Woman Across the River" (Bettye Crutcher, Allen Jones) – 6:58
"Desdemona" (G. Allman, Haynes) – 8:34
"The High Cost of Low Living" (G. Allman, Haynes, Jeff Anders, Ronnie Burgin) – 9:53
"Hoochie Coochie Man" (Willie Dixon) – 9:13
"Revival" (Betts) – 4:10
Disc two
"Trouble No More" (McKinley Morganfield) – 3:34
"Midnight Rider" (G. Allman, Robert Payne) – 3:19
"You Don't Love Me" (Willie Cobbs) – 9:46
"Who to Believe" (Haynes, John Jaworowicz) – 7:05
"Stormy Monday" (T-Bone Walker) – 11:23
"Good Morning Little Schoolgirl" (Sonny Boy Williamson I) – 10:31
"In Memory of Elizabeth Reed" (Betts) – 33:25
Disc three
"Ain't Wastin' Time No More" (G. Allman) – 6:32
"Worried Down with the Blues" (Haynes, Woody, Jaworowicz) – 7:41
"Statesboro Blues" (Will McTell) – 5:24
"Stand Back" (G. Allman, Oakley) – 5:26
"Melissa" (G. Allman) – 5:42
"Mountain Jam" (Donovan Leitch, G. Allman, D. Allman, Betts, Trucks, Oakley, Johanson) – 40:19
"Layla" (Eric Clapton, Jim Gordon) – 7:25
Disc four
"Don't Keep Me Wonderin'" (G. Allman) – 3:58
"Done Somebody Wrong" (Clarence L. Lewis, Elmore James, Morris Levy) – 3:49
"Gambler's Roll" (Haynes, Johnny Neel) – 6:50
"Soulshine" (Haynes) – 7:06
"Who's Been Talking" (Chester Burnett) – 9:33
"Don't Think Twice, It's All Right" (Bob Dylan) – 5:27
"Wasted Words" (G. Allman) – 7:19
"Dreams" (G. Allman) – 12:32
"Whipping Post" (G. Allman) – 14:17
"One Way Out" (James, Marshall Sehorn, Sonny Boy Williamson II) – 6:52
Recording dates
July 25, 2003 – Murat Center, Indianapolis, Indiana
July 26, 2003 – Post-Gazette Pavilion, Burgettstown, Pennsylvania
August 2, 2003 – Darien Lake Performing Arts Center, Darien, New York
August 3, 2003 – Meadows Music Center, Hartford, Connecticut
August 9, 2003 – Verizon Wireless Amphitheatre, Charlotte, North Carolina
August 10, 2003 – Alltel Pavilion, Raleigh, North Carolina

Personnel 
The Allman Brothers Band
Gregg Allman – Hammond B-3 organ, piano, vocals
Warren Haynes – lead and slide guitar, vocals
Derek Trucks – lead and slide guitar
Oteil Burbridge – bass
Butch Trucks – drums
Jaimoe – drums
Marc Quiñones – congas, percussion, vocals
Additional musicians
Karl Denson – saxophone on "Good Morning Little Schoolgirl"
Susan Tedeschi – vocals on "Don't Think Twice, It's All Right"
Branford Marsalis – saxophone on "Dreams", "Whipping Post"
Production
Produced by the Allman Brothers Band
Supervising producer: Warren Haynes
Executive producer: Bert Holman
Associate producers: Bill Levenson, John Lynskey
Mastering: Tom Lewis
Mixing: Bruce "Slim" Judd
Package design: Terry Bradley
Liner notes essay: John Lynskey

References 

The Allman Brothers Band live albums
2018 live albums